Robin Cantegrel (born 13 February 1995) is a French handball player who plays for Pontault-Combault Handball.

References
https://handnews.fr/2019/edf-m-robin-cantegrel-un-pied-dans-le-futur/
https://handnews.fr/2020/ldc-m-filip-taleski-au-vardar-plus-complique-pour-martins/

French male handball players
1995 births
Living people